Evelyne Elien (born 24 March 1964 in Basse-Terre, Guadeloupe) is a former French athlete who specialised in the 400 meters. Elien competed at the 1988 Summer Olympics and 1996 Summer Olympics.

References 
 sports reference

French female sprinters
Guadeloupean female sprinters
Olympic athletes of France
French people of Guadeloupean descent
Living people
Athletes (track and field) at the 1988 Summer Olympics
Athletes (track and field) at the 1996 Summer Olympics
1964 births
Olympic female sprinters